The 1961 Mississippi State Bulldogs football team represented Mississippi State University during the 1961 NCAA University Division football season. After the season, Wade Walker was fired as head coach, but continued to be the athletic director. This was the first season that Mississippi State athletic teams were known as the Bulldogs.

Schedule

References

Mississippi State
Mississippi State Bulldogs football seasons
Mississippi State Bulldogs football